Baram is a federal constituency in Miri Division (Miri District, Beluru District, Marudi District & Telang Usan District), Sarawak, Malaysia, that has been represented in the Dewan Rakyat since 1971.

The federal constituency was created in the 1968 redistribution and is mandated to return a single member to the Dewan Rakyat under the first past the post voting system.

Baram is the second largest parliamentary constituency by area in Malaysia, covering over 22,000 sq km, slightly bigger than the state of Perak.

Demographics 
https://ge15.orientaldaily.com.my/seats/sarawak/p

History

Polling districts 
According to the gazette issued on 31 October 2022, the Baram constituency has a total of 21 polling districts.

Representation history

State constituency

Current state assembly members

Local governments

Election results

References
Bibliography

Citations

Sarawak federal constituencies